The SIG Sauer P365 is a striker-fired subcompact semi-automatic pistol manufactured by SIG Sauer, intended for everyday carry. It is offered with Tritium XRAY3 Day/Night Sights and two 10-round magazines; one flush fit and the other with an extended finger tab, and a stainless steel frame with polymer grip module. It is primarily chambered in 9×19mm Parabellum and is rated for +P (higher pressure) ammunition while utilizing offset double-stack magazines. A variant chambered in .380 ACP was introduced in February 2022. The P365, which replaced the P290RS, is produced in Newington, New Hampshire. In both 2018 and 2019, it was the best selling handgun in the United States.

Features
The P365 is a striker fired, short-recoil handgun with a stainless steel slide, treated with a black Nitron finish, and a stainless steel frame along with a polymer grip module. The slide has serrations on both front and back for easy slide manipulation. The polymer grip accepts a double-stack 10-round, 12-round, or 15-round magazine. The magazine is released by a triangular button on the grip located at the undercut trigger guard section. Per SIG Sauer, the P365 has the lowest bore-axis ratio of any handgun currently made.

Sights are green tritium three-dot night sights that are made of steel and are capable of being used to cycle the slide in the case of one handed use being necessary. Aiming is by combat sighting. A proprietary rail is located below the barrel. Both red and green lasers and a light will be offered as accessory items for this proprietary rail. Adapters to convert the propriety rail to a standard rail for use with standard rail accessories are also available.

Disassembly requires no tools and does not require that the trigger be pulled. For Massachusetts Attorney General compliance requirements, a model with a manual safety and loaded chamber indicator is available. In May 2019, the P365-MS, a model with a manual safety, was made generally available.

Comparisons
The grip encloses a stainless steel fire control unit (FCU) similar to that in the SIG Sauer P320.

The striker firing system is nearly identical to that in the P320. The short recoil locking system is the SIG Sauer System created by SIG Sauer in 1975 for a Swiss Army contract by the then-existing Swiss Industrial Group (Schweizerische Industrie Gesellschaft, SIG). The SIG Sauer System improved upon the Petter-Browning system used in the French Modèle 1935A, which SIG had licensed from SACM in 1937 and used in the SIG P210 handgun design, but is not the same system, having been considerably improved upon.

The P290RS has a restrike capability, but also has a long double-action only trigger pull. The takedown system is similar to that of the P320, in that a lever is turned down with the slide locked back to release the slide from the frame.

A P365 with its optional 15-round magazine is  taller than a Glock 19 with its standard 15-round magazine.

Variants

P365 XL
In June 2019, the P365 XL was released. It utilizes the same fire control unit (FCU) as the P365, while having a larger grip module that accepts 12-round flush magazines, a flat trigger, and a longer slide and barrel. The rear sight on the P365 XL slide is removable, to allow a red dot sight to be attached. The slides and frames of the variants are interchangeable; for example, the longer slide (and barrel) of a P365 XL can be used on a P365 frame and vice versa.

P365 SAS
In October 2019, a SIG Anti-Snag (SAS) version of the P365 was released. It has an optional ported barrel and slide, no front sight, flush takedown and slide catch levers on the frame, and an embedded and flush fiber optic sight at the rear. Other than a slight reduction in height, the SAS variant has the same dimensions and weight as the original P365.

P365X 
In 2021, SIG released the P365X, which incorporated many of the features of the P365 XL, including a flat trigger, a removable rear sight which can be substituted for an optic mount, and a longer hand grip which accommodates flush fit 12-round magazines, but without the longer slide. At launch it was only being sold with the RomeoZero red dot sight preinstalled.

P365-380
In February 2022, SIG announced a variant chambered in .380 ACP, available both with and without a manual safety.

P365-XMACRO

Specifications

P365XL Spectre
SIG has introduced "Spectre" branded variants of the P365 XL through SIG Custom Works. The first P365XL Spectre was introduced in June 2021 featuring a distressed finish and an X-shaped cutout on top of the slide. A revised version was introduced in October 2021 that added a gold-colored barrel and skeletonized the flat trigger. In February 2022, the P365XL Spectre Comp was introduced with an integrated compensator; it also has a gold-colored barrel, but its flat trigger is not skeletonized.

Users

Explanatory notes

References

External links

 Official video by SIG Sauer
 Photograph of SIG Sauer P365

9mm Parabellum semi-automatic pistols
.380 ACP semi-automatic pistols
SIG Sauer semi-automatic pistols
Semi-automatic pistols of the United States
Weapons and ammunition introduced in 2018